The Draper Holdings Business Trust is a business trust company, located in Milton, Delaware.  It is led by Molly Draper Russell, who inherited the company from her father, Thomas Draper, upon his death in 2018.

The philanthropic division of the trust, Draper Holdings Charitable Foundation, Inc., includes WBOC's "Bless Our Children" program which raised and distributed $370,000 in funds in 2016.

In 2007, Draper Holdings Business Trust donated a professional broadcast news set to the University of Maryland Eastern Shore to aid in the production of student programming.  The set was previously used by WBOC-TV.

Companies owned by the trust
Loblolly, LLC – Real Estate Holding Company 
Draper Media
Delmarva Sports Network - local sports network
Television Stations
WBOC-TV – CBS/Fox affiliate
WRDE-LD – NBC affiliate
WBOC-LD – Telemundo affiliate
WRUE-LD - satellite of WRDE-LD
WSJZ-LD – satellite of WBOC-LD
Radio Stations
WBOC-FM – Top 40 radio station
WAAI – Classic country radio station
WCEM – CBS Sports Radio affiliate
WCEM-FM – Mainstream Country radio station
WGBG-FM – Classic rock radio station
WTDK – Oldies radio station
WZBH – Active Rock radio station
WRDE-FM – satellite of WCEM-FM
WRDE-HD2 - satellite of WTDK
W282AW/W286BB - translators of WRDE-HD2

References

External links
 Draper Holdings Business Trust
 Draper Holdings Charitable Foundation

Foundations based in the United States
Companies based in Sussex County, Delaware
Radio broadcasting companies of the United States